Wolf Creek is a stream in eastern St. Francois County in the U.S. state of Missouri. It is a tributary of the St. Francis River.

The stream flows south passing under Missouri Route 32.

Wolf Creek was so named due to the presence of wolves in the area.

See also
List of rivers of Missouri

References

Rivers of St. Francois County, Missouri
Rivers of Missouri